The Redcliffe Dolphins are a semi-professional rugby league club based in Redcliffe, Queensland, Australia. Founded in 1947, they were accepted into the Brisbane Rugby League (BRL) premiership competition in 1960, and since 1996 have played in the Queensland Cup. The Redcliffe Dolphins thrived in the BRL. However, the 1988 admission of the Brisbane Broncos team in the New South Wales Rugby League competition caused the decline of the BRL. 

Although a separately licensed Dolphins (NRL) team currently competes in the fully professional national competition, the Redcliffe squad continues to play in the Queensland competition. Through this NRL licence, the Dolphins organisation has become the only former BRL club to regain top-flight status after that competition became a second-tier league with the advent of the Brisbane Broncos in 1988, similar to the SANFL team Port Adelaide's AFL franchise, the Power.

History
Founded on 27 February 1947, Redcliffe District Rugby League Football Club Inc. (known as Shellgrit) entered Under 17, Reserve Grade and First Grade teams in that year's Sandgate Suburban Rugby League competition. Through the 1950s, Redcliffe also played in the Kilcoy, Murrumba and Geraghty Cup competitions. On 19 November 1959, Redcliffe received full district club status and was accepted into the Brisbane first grade competition.

Throughout the 1960s, a number of famous players came through the ranks of the Dolphins to represent Queensland and Australia, including Trevor Harken and Arthur Beetson. In 1965, Redcliffe won its first Brisbane Rugby League Premiership. In 1972, Redcliffe were coached by former Kangaroo Ken Day. Redcliffe's halfback Greg Oliphant was selected to go on the 1978 Kangaroo tour but did not play in any Test matches. Australian national coach Frank Stanton coached Redcliffe in 1980. The Redcliffe club won further premierships in 1994, 1996 and 1997 and has also appeared in 12 Queensland Cup grand finals, making it the most successful team in that competition.

In the 2000s, a new National Rugby League team based on the Gold Coast proposed calling itself the Gold Coast Dolphins. Redcliffe threatened legal action, so the team was alternatively named the Gold Coast Titans. 

Redcliffe defeated Toowoomba in the 2006 Queensland Cup grand final at Suncorp Stadium under the coaching of Anthony Griffin. In 2018, Redcliffe won their sixth Queensland Cup title, defeating Easts Tigers 36-22.

NRL Team 

 
From 2023 onwards, the Redcliffe Dolphins' fully professional spin-off team, known simply as the Dolphins, compete separately in the National Rugby League. Notwithstanding, the semi-professional Redcliffe Dolphins continue to compete as they are in the Queensland Cup and other Queensland rugby league competitions.

Home ground 
Redcliffe's current home ground, Kayo Stadium, formerly known as Moreton Daily Stadium and Dolphin Oval, was first opened in 1979. After multiple upgrades between 2016 and 2020, the stadium has an approximate capacity of 11,500 including 10,000 seats.

Queensland Cup results
 1996: Runners-up
 1997: Premiers
 1998: Preliminary finalists
 1999: Runners-up
 2000: Premiers
 2001: Runners-up
 2002: Premiers
 2003: Premiers
 2004: 6th
 2005: Preliminary finalists
 2006: Premiers
 2007: Runners-up
 2008: Semi Finalists
 2009: 11th
 2010: 8th
 2011: Preliminary Finals
 2012: Runners-up
 2013: 8th
 2014: 11th
 2015: 7th
 2016: Runners-up
 2017: 2nd
 2018: Premiers
 2019: 7th
 2020: Cancelled due to COVID-19 Pandemic
 2021: 5th
 2022: Runners-up

Notable players 
 Arthur Beetson
 Petero Civoniceva
 Chris Close
  Greg Conescu
 Michael Crocker
 Wally Fullerton-Smith
  Dane Gagai
 Henry Holloway
 Adam Lawton
 Adam Mogg
 Bryan Niebling
 Greg Oliphant
 Shane Perry
 John Ribot 
 Brent Tate
 Reece Walsh
 Kevin Yow Yeh

See also

National Rugby League reserves affiliations

References

Sources
 Redcliffe Dolphins Statistics (archived). Originally retrieved 7 December 2005

External links

 

 
Rugby clubs established in 1947
1947 establishments in Australia
Rugby league teams in Brisbane
Rugby league teams in Queensland
Redcliffe, Queensland